Sampur may refer to:
Sampur, Russia, a rural locality (a selo) in Tambov Oblast, Russia
Sampur, Trincomalee, a town in Trincomalee District, Sri Lanka